Parchim (Mecklenburgisch-Vorpommersch: Parchen) is a town in Mecklenburg-Vorpommern, Germany. It is the capital of the Ludwigslust-Parchim district. It was the birthplace of Helmuth von Moltke the Elder, to whom a monument was erected in 1876.

Founded about 1210, it was the seat of the short-lived Lordship of Parchim-Richenberg, a partition of the Duchy of Mecklenburg, from 1226 until 1248 when the lord relocated to Richenberg. Parchim was absorbed into the Lordship of Werle in 1255. In 1277 Werle was partitioned and Parchim became the seat of Werle-Parchim until it was reunited with Werle-Güstrow in 1307. One branch of the family of the duke of Mecklenburg resided in Parchim during part of the 14th century. It became a prosperous industrial town during the 16th century, but this prosperity was destroyed by the Thirty Years' War.

Population development
 1648 – 1,300
 1789 – 4,000
 1830 – 5,800
 1850 – 6,270
 1910 – 12,804
 1939 – 16,000
 1974 – 23,000
 1990 – 23,800
 2000 – 20,048
 2005 – 19,348

Notable residents

 Helmuth Karl Bernhard von Moltke (1800-1891), Prussian general field marshal, honorary citizen
 Rudolf Tarnow (1867-1933), low German writer
 Elise Blumann (1897-1990), German-Australian expressionist painter
Friedrich Hildebrandt (1898–1948), German SS Obergruppenführer, Gauleiter, executed for war crimes
 Ernst Goldenbaum (1898-1990), politician, chairman of the DBD and Minister of Agriculture and Forestry of the GDR, 1949-1990 Member of the Volkskammer
 HA Schult (born 1939), object and action artist
 Jana Gerisch (born 1978), volleyball player
 Stefanie Weichelt (born 1983), football player
Laura Larsson (born 1989), podcast and radio host

See also
Wockersee

References

External links

 http://www.parchim.de

Cities and towns in Mecklenburg
Ludwigslust-Parchim
1226 establishments in Europe
Populated places established in the 13th century
Grand Duchy of Mecklenburg-Schwerin